Pavol Demeš (born 1956) is a Transatlantic Fellow at the German Marshall Fund's Bratislava office.

References 

Living people
1956 births
Foreign Ministers of Slovakia
Politicians from Bratislava